Mario Nicasio Zanabria (born 1 October 1948 in Santa Fe) is an Argentine former football player, who played as a midfielder, and the current coach of Real España.

Club career
A playmaker, Zanabria made his début in the first division in 1967 with Unión de Santa Fe, where he played until 1969.
From 1970 to 1975 he excelled with Newell's Old Boys, winning the Metropolitano in 1974. He then moved to Boca Juniors, where he would play until 1980, and then again in 1982, winning the 1976 Nacional and Metropolitano, the 1977 and 1978 Copa Libertadores de América and 1978 Intercontinental Cup under coach Toto Lorenzo. Wearing the #10 jersey, he played a total of 179 matches in all competitions with Boca, scoring 16 goals. In 1981, he played for Argentinos Juniors, and for Huracán in 1983 before retiring.

Managerial career
After retirement he coached several teams, including Boca Juniors (1986), Club Atlas (1992-1993), Newell's Old Boys (1997), Unión de Santa Fe (1998), Lanús (1999), Talleres de Córdoba (2001), Querétaro F.C. (2002) and Vélez Sársfield (2004) and Real España (2008 and 2010).

References

External links

 
Informe Xeneize biography 
 
 

1948 births
Living people
Argentine people of Italian descent
Argentine footballers
Argentina international footballers
1975 Copa América players
Unión de Santa Fe footballers
Newell's Old Boys footballers
Boca Juniors footballers
Argentinos Juniors footballers
Club Atlético Huracán footballers
Argentine Primera División players
Argentine football managers
Boca Juniors managers
Newell's Old Boys managers
Unión de Santa Fe managers
Club Atlético Lanús managers
Talleres de Córdoba managers
Club Atlético Vélez Sarsfield managers
Atlas F.C. managers
Querétaro F.C. managers
Real C.D. España managers
Association football midfielders
Footballers from Santa Fe, Argentina